Raibag is one of the 224 constituencies in the Karnataka Legislative Assembly of Karnataka a south state of India. Raibag is also part of Chikkodi Lok Sabha constituency.

Election Results

2018 assembly elections

Members of Legislative Assembly

Mysore State
 1957 (Seat 1): V. L. Patil, Independent
 1957 (Seat 2): Sampatrao Pradhanji Talwalkar, All India Scheduled Caste Federation
 1962: Balu Shidraya Soudagar, Indian National Congress
 1967: V. L. Patil, Indian National Congress
 1972: V. L. Patil, Indian National Congress

Karnataka State
 1978: Nadoni Rama Shidling, Janata Party
 1983: Kamble Shravana Satyappa, Janata Party
 1985: Ghevari Maruti Gangappa, Janata Party
 1989: Ghatage Shama Bhima, Indian National Congress
 1994: Ghatage Shama Bhima, Indian National Congress
 1999: Ghatage Shama Bhima, Indian National Congress
 2004: Sarikar Bheemappa Channappa, Janata Dal (United)
 2008: Duryodhan Mahalingappa Aihole, Bharatiya Janata Party
 2013: Duryodhan Mahalingappa Aihole, Bharatiya Janata Party
 2018: Duryodhan Mahalingappa Aihole, Bharatiya Janata Party

See also
 Raibag (Rural)
 Belagavi district
 Chikkodi Lok Sabha constituency
 List of constituencies of Karnataka Legislative Assembly

References

 

Assembly constituencies of Karnataka
Belagavi district